University City High School (UCHS)  is a comprehensive four-year public high school located in the University City section of San Diego, California, United States. It is part of the San Diego Unified School District.  The school opened its doors on September 1981.  The school was ranked 222nd in 2008 and 297th in 2009 on Newsweeks list of Best U.S. Public High Schools.  In 2013, The Washington Post ranked the school as the 602nd most challenging high school in America.

Academic assessment
UCHS offers a wide range of instructional programs. The Advanced Placement Program, Gifted and Talented Education (GATE) Program, the seminar program, and the special education program address the needs of identified students. UCHS students have the opportunity to take visual and performing arts courses and practical arts courses.

The school offers 15 AP classes: Biology, Chemistry, Environmental Science, Physics C, Statistics, US Government, US History, World History, English Language and Composition, English Literature and Composition, Art History, Studio Art, Psychology, and Spanish Language.  The school also participates in the Accelerated College Program with San Diego Mesa College to offer Calculus, Linear Algebra, Discrete Mathematics, and Political Science. These classes are taught by Mesa College professors on the University City High School campus. The school also provides some performance programs, such as breakdancing and freestyle dance.

Sports

UCHS Badminton - CIF Champions: 2005, 2015, 2017
UCHS Boys' Varsity Soccer - CIF Champions: 2004, 2005, 2011, 2013, 2017
UCHS Boys' Varsity Soccer - 2011: State semi-finalists
UCHS Boys' Varsity Basketball - 2011: Centurions 1st Division III CIF 
UCHS Girls' Varsity Softball - 2011, 2010, 2009 CIF Champions
UCHS Boys' Varsity Track and Field - 2011 CIF Champions
UCHS Girls’ Varsity Track and Field - 2019 CIF Champions 
UCHS Baseball - 2007 CIF Champions
UCHS Football - 2022 CIF Champions
UCHS Girls’ Varsity Field Hockey - 2022 CIF Champions

University City High School offers sports programs for student-athletes.

Fall sports
 
Boys' and girls' cross country
 Field hockey
 Football
 Girls' tennis
 Girls' volleyball
 Boys' water polo
 Color guard
 Marching band
 Boys’ beach volleyball 
 Girls’ golf

Winter sports

 
 Boys' and girls' basketball
 Boys' and girls' soccer
 Wrestling
 Girls' water polo

Spring sports

 
 Badminton
 Baseball
 Golf
 Lacrosse
 Softball
 Swimming
 Boys' tennis
 Track and field
 Boys' volleyball
 Color guard
 Girls’ beach volleyball

Music department

 UC marching band
SCSBOA state finalists since 2015, with a silver medal in both 2017 and 2018 in the 2A division. Received the gold medal at 2A division championships in 2019, following an undefeated season.

 UC color guard
 Orchestra
 Jazz band
 Pep band
 Choir

Logos and school colors
The color palette of the school, as well as their three primary logos, the UC Script, the Centurion, and the UC block logo, are given below. The block logo is used as the "Varsity Letter" style for all varsity letter-earning athletes.

Notable alumni
Rhett Bernstein – soccer player
Matt Brock – professional football player in the National Football League
Mac Fleet – professional track & field Athlete, 2x NCAA Track and Field National Champion in the 1500m for the University of Oregon
Jennifer Gross – college basketball coach
Kyle Holder – shortstop in the New York Yankees organization
Kent Ninomiya – TV news anchor, reporter and executive
Tim Patrick – NFL wide receiver for the Denver Broncos
Tyler Saladino – professional baseball player for the Milwaukee Brewers
Félix Sánchez – two-time Olympic gold medalist in the 400 meter hurdles, representing the Dominican Republic
Mike Saipe – Major League Baseball pitcher
Ken Waldichuk - Major League Baseball pitcher

References

External links
 School website

Educational institutions established in 1981
High schools in San Diego
Public high schools in California
1981 establishments in California